The 1927 Baltimore mayoral election saw the return of William Frederick Broening to the mayoralty for a second nonconsecutive term.

General election
The general election was held May 3.

References

Baltimore mayoral
Mayoral elections in Baltimore
Baltimore